Group 7 may refer to:

G7, an international group of finance minister
Group 7 element, chemical element classification
Halogens (alternative name)
Group 7 Rugby League, rugby league competition in New South Wales, Australia
Group 7 (racing), FIA classification for Can-Am sports car racing 
Group Seven Children's Foundation, charitable organization